Lady on a Train is a 1945 American film noir crime film directed by Charles David and starring Deanna Durbin, Ralph Bellamy, and David Bruce.

Based on a story by Leslie Charteris, the film is about a woman who witnesses a murder in a nearby building from her train window. After she reports the murder to the police, who quickly dismiss her story, she turns to a popular mystery writer to help her solve the crime. The film received an Academy Award nomination for Best Sound. Western star Lash LaRue played a waiter in the film, uncredited.

Plot
San Francisco debutante Nicki Collins goes to visit her aunt in New York.  Her father's employee, Haskell, is to meet her and facilitate her stay.  Before reaching Grand Central, Nicki's train makes a brief stop and, when she looks up from the book she is reading - a mystery by novelist Wayne Morgan - she witnesses a murder in a nearby building.

Upon arrival, she slips away from Haskell and goes to the police, but the desk sergeant, seeing the novel in her hand, assumes she imagined the crime.  She decides that Wayne Morgan must be able to solve a murder, finds him, and pesters him to get involved.  Following Morgan and his fiancee into a theater, she sees a newsreel about the "accidental" death of shipping magnate Josiah Waring—and recognizes him as the murder victim.

Unable to find the crime scene, Nicki sneaks onto the grounds of Waring's mansion.  She is mistaken for Margo Martin, who was expected but has not come.  Waring's will is read by his lawyer, Wiggam: Waring's nephews Arnold and Jonathan are not surprised to receive a token $1 inheritance, while the bulk of the estate goes to Margo Martin—his trophy fiancee and a singer at a nightclub he owns.  Nicki snoops around the house and absconds with a pair of bloody slippers that disprove the story of an accident.  Two conspirators in the murder try but fail to stop her: Saunders, who turns out to be the nightclub's manager and another heir, and the chauffeur, Danny.

Back with Haskell, Nicki makes another attempt to involve Morgan, phoning him and pretending a man is there attacking her—not realizing that Danny is there and is about to do just that.  Before he can, she makes another call, to her father.  While she is singing to him, Danny spots the slippers and departs, separately attacking Haskell and Morgan. Nicki subsequently assumes they mistakenly attacked each other.

For various reasons, everyone goes to the nightclub.  Nicki speaks to Margo and becomes suspicious.  She locks Margo in a closet, goes on stage, and sings in her place.  When freed, Margo tells Saunders she was never interested in the plot and stalks off; she is later murdered.

Arnold and Jonathan make romantic overtures to Nicki, but Saunders has her called backstage.  He and Danny admit their involvement in the murder and threaten her, but Morgan breaks into the room and Nicki takes the slippers back.  A series of backstage fights follows.  Nicki escapes, returns to the stage and sings again.  Morgan learns that one of the people she is sitting with—Arnold, Jonathan, and Wiggam—must be the murderer and manages to warn her.  Meanwhile, Morgan's fiancee, thinking he is two-timing her with Nicki, dumps him.

Danny shoots Saunders.  Nicki and Morgan leave with the slippers, but are arrested in the morning, based on false information from Danny.  Nicki tries to present the slippers, but Morgan's valet has them—and proudly reveals how clean they now are.

Arnold, Jonathan, and Haskell all arrive at the jail to pay Nicki's bail.  Arnold says the Warings would like to meet her and drives her to their company's offices, but nobody is there.  They talk about the case and he admits that he had motive, but so did Jonathan, Wiggam, and especially Saunders.  Frightened, Nicki manages to get away from him.

Finding Jonathan in the building, she tells him that Arnold is the murderer.  They hide in a room, which she realizes is the scene of the crime she saw from the train.  Jonathan is the murderer.  He confesses, bragging: next he will kill her, frame Arnold, and kill Arnold, supposedly while defending Nicki.

Arnold slips into the room and grabs Jonathan's gun, but then Morgan arrives and mistakes the situation, and Jonathan gets it back.  As Morgan tries unconvincingly to tell Jonathan that the police will be coming, they do.

In the final scene, Nicki and Wayne Morgan are newlyweds on a train.  She is enjoying his newest book so much she tells the porter not to make up their beds until she finishes reading, and Morgan promptly tells her how it ends.

Cast
 Deanna Durbin as Nicki Collins 
 Ralph Bellamy as Jonathan Waring
 David Bruce as Wayne Morgan
 George Coulouris as Mr. Saunders, Circus Club Manager
 Allen Jenkins as Danny
 Dan Duryea as Arnold Waring
 Edward Everett Horton as Mr. Haskell
 Jacqueline deWit as Miss Fletcher
 Patricia Morison as Joyce Williams
 Elizabeth Patterson as Aunt Charlotte Waring
 Maria Palmer as Margo Martin
 Samuel S. Hinds as Mr. Wiggam
 William Frawley as Desk Sgt. Brennan
 Thurston Hall as Josiah Waring (uncredited)
 Kathleen O'Malley as Photographer
 Lash LaRue as a club waiter (uncredited)

Production
In October 1943 Leslie Charteris was reportedly working on the story as a vehicle for Deanna Durbin. Charteris worked on it immediately after his honeymoon. The film was part of an attempt by producer Felix Jackson to diversify Durbin's image, that also included Christmas Holiday.

In September 1944 Charles David, who has just directed The Faries Tale Murder was assigned to direct.

Donald Cook, Robert Paige and Franchot Tone were discussed as possible leading men. In January the job went to David Bruce who had played support in Durbin's previous two films. Felix Jackson says Bruce was cast on the strength of his work in Christmas Holiday.

There was some second unit location work done on the New York subway in November 1944. Filming was to have begun December 15, 1944 but did not start until January 17, 1945.

The cast also included Dan Duryea and Ralph Bellamy, who was borrowed from Hunt Stromberg.

Soundtrack
 "Silent Night" (Joseph Mohr, Franz Gruber, John Freeman Young)
 "Give Me a Little Kiss" (Roy Turk, Jack Smith, Maceo Pinkard)
 "Night and Day" (Cole Porter)

Novelization
A novelization by Leslie Charteris adapting the screenplay was published by Shaw Press in 1945. It has the distinction of being the first fiction novel by Charteris that did not feature Simon Templar to be published since the early 1930s, and the last such publication of his career as (except for some non-fiction) he only published books featuring Templar thereafter.

Legacy
Agatha Christie's 4.50 from Paddington which was published in 1957 borrows an identical opening premise from Lady on a Train where a woman witnesses a murder from a train window and is initially disbelieved because she was reading a murder mystery novel at the time. In 1990, Charteris's story was adapted for the pilot episode of the television series Over My Dead Body.

The scenario of a lady witnessing a murder from a train was used as the basis for the Return of the Saint episode "Signal Stop"—the character of Simon Templar having been created by Lady on a Train writer Leslie Charteris. The executive producer of Return of the Saint, Robert S Baker, said that Leslie Charteris was surprised on reading the "Signal Stop" script, noting its similarity with Lady on a Train. It is not known whether "Signal Stop" writer John Kruse had seen the film prior to writing the episode.

It is possible with all the similarities that this film may have inspired the writing of The Girl on the Train, although that has never been addressed to date.

Awards and nominations
 1946 Academy Award Nomination for Best Sound (Bernard B. Brown)

References

External links
 
 
 
 
 

1945 films
1945 comedy films
1945 crime films
1940s American films
1940s comedy mystery films
1940s crime comedy films
1940s English-language films
American black-and-white films
American comedy mystery films
American crime comedy films
Film noir
Films scored by Miklós Rózsa
Films set on trains
Murder mystery films
Novels by Leslie Charteris
Universal Pictures films